The following outline is provided as an overview of and topical guide to Fiji:

Republic of Fiji – sovereign island nation located in the South Pacific Ocean east of Vanuatu, west of Tonga and south of Tuvalu.  The country occupies an archipelago of about 322 islands, of which 106 are permanently inhabited, and 522 islets. The two major islands, Viti Levu and Vanua Levu, account for 87% of the population.

General reference

 Pronunciation: 
 Common English country names: Fiji or the Fiji Islands
 Official English country name: The Republic of Fiji
 Common endonym(s): Viti, फ़िजी  
 Official endonym(s): Matanitu Tugalala o Viti, फ़िजी गणराज्य  
 Adjectival(s): Fijian
 Demonym(s): Fijian
 Etymology: Name of Fiji
 ISO country codes:  FJ, FJI, 242
 ISO region codes:  See ISO 3166-2:FJ
 Internet country code top-level domain:  .fj

Geography of Fiji 

Geography of Fiji
 Fiji is: a country
 Location:
 Southern Hemisphere and Eastern Hemisphere
 Pacific Ocean
 South Pacific
 Oceania
 Melanesia
 Time zone:  UTC+12
 Extreme points of Fiji
 High:  Tomanivi 
 Low:  South Pacific Ocean 0 m
 Land boundaries:  none
 Coastline:  1,129 km
Population of Fiji: 827,900 (2007)  - 157th most populous country

Area of Fiji: 18,274 km2
 Atlas of Fiji

Environment of Fiji 

 Climate of Fiji
 Renewable energy in Fiji
 Geology of Fiji
 Protected areas of Fiji
 Biosphere reserves in Fiji
 National parks of Fiji
 Wildlife of Fiji
 Fauna of Fiji
 Birds of Fiji
 Mammals of Fiji

Natural geographic features of Fiji 

 Islands of Fiji
 Lakes of Fiji
 Mountains of Fiji
 Volcanoes in Fiji
 Rivers of Fiji
 Waterfalls of Fiji
 World Heritage Sites in Fiji: None

Regions of Fiji 

Regions of Fiji

Ecoregions of Fiji 

List of ecoregions in Fiji

Administrative divisions of Fiji 

 Provinces of Fiji

Provinces of Fiji 

Provinces of Fiji

Municipalities of Fiji 

 Capital of Fiji: Suva
 Cities of Fiji

Demography of Fiji 

Demographics of Fiji

Government and politics of Fiji 

Politics of Fiji
 Form of government: parliamentary representative democratic republic.
 Capital of Fiji: Suva
 Elections in Fiji
 Political parties in Fiji

Branches of the government of Fiji 

Government of Fiji

Executive branch of the government of Fiji 
 Head of state: President of Fiji, Jioji Konrote
 Head of government: Prime Minister of Fiji, Josaia Voreqe (Frank) Bainimarama
 Cabinet: Cabinet of Fiji

Legislative branch of the government of Fiji 
 Parliament of Fiji (unicameral, since 2014)
 Previous Parliament (bicameral, 1970-2006) :
Upper house: Senate
Lower house: House of Representatives

Judicial branch of the government of Fiji 

Court system of Fiji
 Supreme Court of Fiji

Foreign relations of Fiji 

Foreign relations of Fiji
 Diplomatic missions in Fiji
 Diplomatic missions of Fiji

International organization membership 
The Republic of the Fiji Islands is a member of:

African, Caribbean, and Pacific Group of States (ACP)
Asian Development Bank (ADB)
Colombo Plan (CP)
Commonwealth of Nations
Food and Agriculture Organization (FAO)
Group of 77 (G77)
International Bank for Reconstruction and Development (IBRD)
International Civil Aviation Organization (ICAO)
International Criminal Court (ICCt)
International Criminal Police Organization (Interpol)
International Development Association (IDA)
International Federation of Red Cross and Red Crescent Societies (IFRCS)
International Finance Corporation (IFC)
International Fund for Agricultural Development (IFAD)
International Hydrographic Organization (IHO)
International Labour Organization (ILO)
International Maritime Organization (IMO)
International Monetary Fund (IMF)
International Olympic Committee (IOC)
International Organization for Standardization (ISO)
International Red Cross and Red Crescent Movement (ICRM)
International Telecommunication Union (ITU)

International Telecommunications Satellite Organization (ITSO)
International Trade Union Confederation (ITUC)
Multilateral Investment Guarantee Agency (MIGA)
Organisation for the Prohibition of Chemical Weapons (OPCW)
Pacific Islands Forum (PIF)
Permanent Court of Arbitration (PCA)
Secretariat of the Pacific Community (SPC)
South Pacific Regional Trade and Economic Cooperation Agreement (Sparteca)
United Nations (UN)
United Nations Conference on Trade and Development (UNCTAD)
United Nations Educational, Scientific, and Cultural Organization (UNESCO)
United Nations Industrial Development Organization (UNIDO)
United Nations Integrated Mission in Timor-Leste (UNMIT)
United Nations Mission in the Sudan (UNMIS)
Universal Postal Union (UPU)
World Customs Organization (WCO)
World Federation of Trade Unions (WFTU)
World Health Organization (WHO)
World Intellectual Property Organization (WIPO)
World Meteorological Organization (WMO)
World Tourism Organization (UNWTO)
World Trade Organization (WTO)

Law and order in Fiji 

Law of Fiji
 2013 Constitution of Fiji
 previous: 1997 Constitution of Fiji
 Crime in Fiji
 Human rights in Fiji
 LGBT rights in Fiji
 Freedom of religion in Fiji
 Law enforcement in Fiji

Military of Fiji 

 Command
 Commander-in-chief: President Ratu Epeli Nailatikau
 Commander: Brigadier Mosese Tikoitoga
 Ministry of Defence of Fiji
 Forces
 Army of Fiji
 Navy of Fiji
 Air Force of Fiji
 Special forces of Fiji
 Military history of Fiji
 Military ranks of Fiji

Local government in Fiji 

Local government in Fiji

History of Fiji 

History of Fiji
Timeline of the history of Fiji
Current events of Fiji
 Military history of Fiji

Culture of Fiji 

Culture of Fiji
 Architecture of Fiji
 Cuisine of Fiji
 List of festivals in Fiji
 Languages of Fiji
 Media in Fiji
 National symbols of Fiji
 Coat of arms of Fiji
 Flag of Fiji
 National anthem of Fiji
 People of Fiji
 Public holidays in Fiji
 Records of Fiji
 Religion in Fiji
 Christianity in Fiji
 Hinduism in Fiji
 Islam in Fiji
 Judaism in Fiji
 Sikhism in Fiji
 World Heritage Sites in Fiji: 1: Levuka Historical Port Town

Art in Fiji 
 Art in Fiji
 Cinema of Fiji
 Fijian literature
 Music of Fiji
 Television in Fiji
 Theatre in Fiji

Sports in Fiji 

Sports in Fiji
 Football in Fiji
 Fiji at the Olympics
 Fiji at the Paralympics

Economy and infrastructure of Fiji 

Economy of Fiji
 Economic rank, by nominal GDP (2007): 137th (one hundred and thirty seventh)
 Agriculture in Fiji
 Banking in Fiji
 National Bank of Fiji
 Communications in Fiji
 Internet in Fiji
 Companies of Fiji
Currency of Fiji: Dollar
ISO 4217: FJD
 Energy in Fiji
 Energy policy of Fiji
 Oil industry in Fiji
 Mining in Fiji
 Tourism in Fiji
 Visa policy of Fiji
 Fiji Stock Exchange

Education in Fiji 

Education in Fiji

Infrastructure of Fiji
 Health care in Fiji
 Transportation in Fiji
 Airports in Fiji
 Rail transport in Fiji
 Roads in Fiji
 Rewa Bridge

See also 

Fiji

Index of Fiji-related articles
List of Fiji-related topics
List of international rankings
Member state of the United Nations
Outline of geography
Outline of Oceania

References

External links

 
 CIA Factbook
 Official Website of the Government of Fiji
 Official Website of the Parliament of Fiji
 Bulafiji.com. Official Fiji Visitors Bureau website
 The Fiji Times - Fiji News, Sport and Weather from Fiji's leading newspaper
 
 Documents affecting Fiji at the Diplomacy Monitor
 Seacology Fiji Projects Seacology

Fiji